The Lipeo River (Spanish, Río Lipeo) is a river of Argentina. It is a tributary of the Bermejo River.

See also
 List of rivers of Argentina
 List of tributaries of the Río de la Plata

References

 Rand McNally, The New International Atlas, 1993.

Rivers of Argentina
Tributaries of the Paraguay River
Rivers of Salta Province